The Worker's Socialist Party was a Trotskyist political party in Argentina.

History
In 1965, Nahuel Moreno merged Palabra Obrera (Worker's Word) with Mario Santucho's FRIP, resulting in the Worker's Revolutionary Party. After the Cordobazo, morenists clashed against santuchists because of the place industrial workers had in the proletarian revolution. Santucho, leader of the party, declared that the real proletariat were the peasants and not the industrial workers. Moreno and his followers left the party and established the Worker's Socialist Party in 1972.

In 1973, Moreno offered Agustín Tosco to be the presidential candidate for March elections, but he refused. Instead, Juan Carlos Coral ran for President both in March and September, getting 0,62% and 1,54% of the votes respectively.

After the 1976 Coup, the party went underground and renamed as Movement for Socialism.

References

Communist parties in Argentina
Trotskyist organisations in Argentina
Political parties in Argentina
Political parties established in 1972
Political parties disestablished in 1982